Mohamed Razip bin Ismail or popularly known as Razip Ismail (born 23 April 1962) is a Malaysian former football player and coach. His preferred playing position is as a defender. His last job was as the manager of MOF FC in 2018.

Career as player
He formerly played for Kuala Lumpur FA from 1979 to 1994. He was in the Kuala Lumpur team that won Malaysia Cup three times in a row (1987, 1988, 1989), FA Cup two times in a row (1993, 1994) and the league championship (1986, 1988).

Razip also played for Malaysia in international tournaments. He was part of the team that clinched the football gold medal for Malaysia in the 1989 Sea Games held in Kuala Lumpur.

Career as coach
Razip coached his former team Kuala Lumpur FA from 2008 until 2012. During that time Kuala Lumpur were promoted to the Malaysia Super League in 2009 before being relegated to the Malaysia Premier League in 2012.

He took over as head coach of Harimau Muda B, who were playing in the Singapore's S.League, from Ismail Ibrahim in 2013, on a 2-year contract. With the team, he won plate winner 2013 Singapore League Cup. On February 8, 2015, Razip won his first ever international tournament as coach after beating Bangladesh 3-2 in Bangabandhu Cup final, awarding the Malaysia U-22 squad the cup.

On 17 March 2016, Razip was appointed head coach of Pahang FC. His contract was not renewed at the end of the 2016 season.

Razip next was announced as the new head coach of Perlis FA for their 2017 Malaysia Premier League season. But, on 6 March 2017, he quits as Perlis FA head coach, his team rooted to the bottom of the league.

On December 2017, Razip was announced as MOF F.C. head coach for their 2018 Malaysia FAM Cup season.

References

1962 births
Living people
Malaysian footballers
Malaysia international footballers
Kuala Lumpur City F.C. players
Malaysian football managers
People from Selangor
Association football defenders
Footballers at the 1990 Asian Games
Sri Pahang FC managers
Southeast Asian Games gold medalists for Malaysia
Southeast Asian Games medalists in football
Competitors at the 1989 Southeast Asian Games
Asian Games competitors for Malaysia
Kuala Lumpur City F.C. managers